Eslamabad-e Sar Meydan (also Romanized as Eslāmābād-e Sar Meydān; also known as Eslāmābād) is a village in Rameshk Rural District, Chah Dadkhoda District, Qaleh Ganj County, Kerman Province, Iran. At the 2006 census, its population was 133, in 30 families.

References 

Populated places in Qaleh Ganj County